{{Infobox writer
| name = Jordan Ifueko
| image = Jordan Ifueko.webp
| birth_name = 
| birth_date = 
| birth_place = Southern California
| death_date = 
| occupation = Writer
| nationality = Nigeria United States
| period = 2019-Present
| notableworks = Raybearer
Redemptor 
| alma_mater = George Fox University
| spouse = 
| website = 
| education = 
| awards = 
| genre = Fantasy
| caption = Jordan Ifueko in 2020
}}
Jordan Ifueko (born August 16, 1993) is a Nigerian American writer of fantasy and young adult fiction. She is best known for her novel Raybearer, which became a New York Times bestseller, and its sequel, Redemptor. She also writes short stories, which have been published in Strange Horizons.

 Early life 
Jordan Ifueko was born in Southern California to two Nigerian parents who migrated to the United States; her mother is from the Yoruba tribe while her father is from the Bini tribe. Ifueko stated she grew up listening to West African folktales which were narrated by her mother. She was home schooled by her parents and attended George Fox University in Oregon. She is married and lives in Atlanta with her family.

 Career 
Ifueko's debut novel Raybearer, inspired partly by her West African heritage and other world cultures, was published on August 18, 2020, by Abrams books, and became a New York Times bestseller. It was nominated for the Andre Norton Award and the Goodreads Choice Award for best Debut Novel and best Young Adult Fantasy & Science Fiction. The novel was honoured as one of the American Library Association's (ALA) Amazing Audiobooks for Young Adults and ALA Top Ten Best Fiction. was followed by a sequel, Redemptor, published in 2021 which was nominated for Ignyte Awards, Lodestar Award and Andre Norton Award.

In September 2021, it was announced that Netflix will be adapting Raybearer into a television series, under a new overall deal with Gina Atwater. The project will be produced by Suger23 and Macro Television Studios with Atwater as writer, director and producer.

Other Works

In July 2022, Marvel Comics announced that Ifueko will be writing a new Moon Girl & Devils Dinosaur comics, it will be drawn by Alba Glez and scheduled for publication in December.

 Bibliography 

 Novels 
 Raybearer, Amulet Books (2020)
 Redemptor'', Amulet Books (2021)

References 

21st-century American novelists
21st-century Nigerian novelists
American women novelists
Living people
American people of Nigerian descent
American writers of young adult literature
Nigerian fantasy writers
American fantasy writers
Afrofuturist writers
1993 births
21st-century American women writers
Writers from Los Angeles
Women science fiction and fantasy writers
Black speculative fiction authors
African-American novelists
21st-century African-American women writers
21st-century African-American writers
Nigerian women writers
George Fox University alumni